Vincent Gragnic (born 23 June 1983) is a retired French footballer who played as midfielder.

Career
Having left AJ Auxerre at the end of his contract, Gragnic signed a one-year deal with Strasbourg on 10 July 2016.

References

External links

1983 births
Living people
People from Quimperlé
Association football midfielders
French footballers
Ligue 1 players
Ligue 2 players
Championnat National players
FC Lorient players
Olympique de Marseille players
FC Libourne players
ES Troyes AC players
Stade de Reims players
CS Sedan Ardennes players
Entente SSG players
Nîmes Olympique players
AJ Auxerre players
RC Strasbourg Alsace players
Sportspeople from Finistère
Footballers from Brittany